Onykia loennbergii, the Japanese hooked squid, is a species of squid in the family Onychoteuthidae, named for Swedish zoologist Einar Lönnberg. It occurs in the Western Pacific Ocean, at an estimated depth of 230–1200 m. The mantle length is approximately 300 mm. Each tentacular club contains 25 hooks. The arms are about 60% of the size of the mantle length.

References

"Moroteuthis loennbergii, Japanese Hooked Squid", SeaLifeBase. http://www.sealifebase.org/summary/speciessummary.php?id=57316, October 29, 2008.
"Onykia loennbergii, ToLweb. http://www.tolweb.org/Onykia_loennbergii/19974, October 29, 2008.

Squid
Molluscs described in 1914